Rupert Wilfred Bartlett (January 23, 1921 – December 31, 2000) was a lawyer, judge and politician in Newfoundland. He represented Trinity South in the Newfoundland House of Assembly from 1971 to 1972.

The son of Lewis G. Bartlett and Clara Thompson, he was born in St. John's and was educated at Prince of Wales College and Memorial University. He took part in five Arctic expeditions led by Robert Bartlett. Bartlett was called to the Newfoundland bar in 1944; he was named Queen's Counsel in 1963. From 1969 to 1974, he was president of the Law Society of Newfoundland. Bartlett was named to the Supreme Court of Newfoundland in 1974.

He was elected to the Newfoundland assembly in 1971.

Bartlett died at St. Patrick's Mercy Home in St. John's at the age of 79.

References 

1921 births
2000 deaths
Canadian King's Counsel
Judges in Newfoundland and Labrador
Liberal Party of Newfoundland and Labrador MHAs
Politicians from St. John's, Newfoundland and Labrador